Manu García may refer to:

Manu García (footballer, born 1986), Spanish footballer
Manu García (footballer, born 1991), Spanish footballer
Manu García (footballer, born 1998), Spanish footballer